Margalla King is an extended play (EP) by Pakistani hip hop artist Adil Omar. It was released independently in 2016.

The EP includes 3 tracks featuring a collaboration with Bun B and an uncredited cameo from Elliphant. The EP is produced by Adil Omar and Talal Qureshi as SNKM.

Track listing

References

2016 EPs
Adil Omar albums